Thor Eric Nelson (born January 6, 1968 in Westminster, California but grew up in Minot, North Dakota) is an American former National Hockey League linesman, who wore uniform number 80.  He has worked the Stanley Cup Playoffs, the 2004 NHL All-Star Game, 2006 Winter Olympics and the 2010 Olympics. Nelson retired in 2013, under doctors' orders due to post-concussion syndrome.

References

1968 births
Sportspeople from Minot, North Dakota
Living people
National Hockey League officials

sl:Pierre Racicot